Ilhéu Bom Bom is an island in the Gulf of Guinea. The islet is located near the north coast of the island of Príncipe, one of the main islands of São Tomé and Príncipe and is almost completely forested. Its population is 15 (2008 est.). There is a tourist resort on the island. The island is connected to the main island of Principe by a footbridge. There is a lighthouse on the island built in 1997.

Since 2012, it forms a part of the UNESCO's Island of Príncipe Biosphere Reserve.

References

External links

Islands of São Tomé and Príncipe
Populated coastal places in São Tomé and Príncipe
Populated places in the Autonomous Region of Príncipe